The Whack Attack Tour was a concert tour by rock band ZZ Top. Whack Attack was a 24-week-long tour in the United States and Canada, which was a longer outing than the previous Summer North American Tour. It began in June 2005 and ended in November 2005. The set was designed by Chris Stuba and had a 'retro garage' theme, with custom microphone stands and drum kit; tinsel was used as a backdrop. Risers were made out of diamond-plated steel. The set list highlighted material from the albums Mescalero (2003), Chrome, Smoke & BBQ (2003), and Rancho Texicano (2004). Billy Gibbons and Dusty Hill appeared on stage in sequined blazers. The show has received positive criticism, complimenting their showmanship, as well as the longevity of their signature sound and look.

Stage design and show production
The Whack Attack Tour's production was designed by lighting technician Chris Stuba, who had worked with the band for the past eleven years. The backdrop was made of black and silver-colored tinsel, with drum and amplifier risers made of diamond-plated steel. Microphone stands were designed by John A. Douglas, who also designed the drum kit for Frank Beard used on the tour; the stands were made from truck exhaust pipes and were equipped with built-in LED tubes that changed color during the show, as well as Electro-Voice 664 dynamic microphones. The drum kit was painted with a lime green, leopard print design, including bass drums made with hubcaps on the outside and spun during the show. Gibbons and Hill used Crate V-50 2x12" combo amplifiers as monitors. The lighting package was supplied by Bandit Lites, consisting of mostly Vari-Lite fixtures including VL3500 spot lights.

Tour dates

Citations

References

ZZ Top concert tours
2005 concert tours